The Port Terminal of Limón,  (Spanish: Terminal Portuaria de Limón), whose official name is Hernán Garrón Salazar Terminal, adjacent to the city of Limón, is one of the seaports in the Caribbean coast of Costa Rica.

The port was officially established in 1852, during the government of Juan Rafael Mora Porras, but it was not linked to the capital, San José, or to the rest of the country until the 1890s, when the construction of the railroad to the Atlantic was finished by the United States businessman Minor C. Keith.

See also
 Port of Moín, operated by JAPDEVA
 Moín Container Terminal, operated by APM Terminals

References

External links
 JAPDEVA's (Costa Rica's Caribbean Ports Authority) information about the Terminal at Limón

Port settlements in Central America
Transport in Costa Rica
Buildings and structures in Limón Province